ISO 22392:2020 Security and resilience - Community resilience - Guidelines for conducting peer reviews, is an international standard developed by ISO/TC 292 Security and resilience and published by the International Organization for Standardization in 2020: 
ISO 22392 gives various of recommendations on how to conduct peer reviews of community resilience and design a peer review tool to assess community preparedness for disasters.

Scope and contents 
ISO 22392 includes the following main clauses:
 Scope
 Normative references
 Terms and definitions
 Plan the peer review
 Conduct the peer review
 Assess the impact of the peer review
 Improve the process of the peer review
Annex A Example tasks to be conducted before, during and after the peer review visit 
Annex B Descriptions of analysis areas to be peer reviewed
Annex C Example of an evidence-recording template
Annex D Example peer review visit timetable
Annex E Generic discussion points and questions to ask about each analysis area
Annex F Example form for reviewer to record information

Related standards
ISO 22392 is part of a series of standards on Community resilience. The other standards are: 
 ISO 22315:2015 Societal security – Mass evacuation – Guidelines for planning
 ISO 22319:2017 Security and resilience – Community resilience – Guidelines for planning the involvement of spontaneous volunteers
 ISO 22395:2018 Security and resilience – Community resilience – Guidelines for supporting vulnerable persons in an emergency
 ISO 22396:2020 Security and resilience – Community resilience – Guidelines for information exchange between organisations

History

See also 
 List of ISO standards
 International Organization for Standardization

References

External links 
 ISO 22392— Security and resilience - Community resilience - Guidelines for supporting vulnerable persons in an emergency
 ISO TC 292— Security and resilience
 ISO 22392 at isotc292online.org

22392